Johns' groove-toed frog or Johns' frog (Rana johnsi), is a frog species in the true frog family (Ranidae). It is found in scattered locations in southern China and Vietnam and in the Khammouan Province of Laos, eastern Cambodia, and north-central Thailand. Its natural habitats are subtropical or tropical evergreen forests where it can be found in leaf-litter and on low vegetation near streams. It breeds in paddy fields, at least. It is mostly known from protected areas without other major threats than fires. It is not considered threatened by the IUCN.

References

Rana (genus)
Amphibians described in 1921
Amphibians of Cambodia
Amphibians of China
Amphibians of Laos
Amphibians of Thailand
Amphibians of Vietnam
Taxa named by Malcolm Arthur Smith
Taxonomy articles created by Polbot